Drakeford is a surname. Notable people with the surname include:

Arthur Drakeford (1878–1957), Australian politician
Arthur Drakeford Jr. (1904–1959), Australian politician
Geoff Drakeford (born 1991), Australian golfer
Mark Drakeford (born 1954), Welsh politician
Richard Drakeford (1936–2009), British composer
Tyronne Drakeford (born 1971), American football player